Michael Kosta (September 27, 1979) is an American stand-up comedian and former tennis player. In July 2017, he joined The Daily Show as a correspondent. He has also hosted The Comment Section for the E! Network with producer Joel McHale as well as co-hosting Fox Sports 1’s Crowd Goes Wild.

Early life 
Kosta was born and raised in Ann Arbor, Michigan, and went to Huron High School before attending the University of Illinois. He is of Greek descent. After earning a bachelor's degree in Speech Communications in 2002, Kosta played tennis on the ITF and ATP tour  for two years before being hired as the Assistant Men's Tennis Coach for the University of Michigan. While he was the assistant coach, he began to explore his interest in stand-up comedy and performed at local comedy clubs on the side. In 2005, Kosta began a full-time job as a stand-up comic based in Los Angeles.

Career

Stand-up comedy 
Kosta has had major appearances on The Tonight Show with Jay Leno, Conan, Chelsea Lately, and Late Night with Seth Meyers  as well as a half-hour Comedy Central special called Comedy Central Presents: Michael Kosta, in January 2011. He has also made appearances on TruTV's World's Dumbest, performed at the HBO Comedy Festival in Aspen, and at the Montreal Just for Laughs Festival. Kosta also shot a pilot with Comedy Central called Overloaded with Michael Kosta in fall 2011, but as of October 2012, it has not been broadcast. In 2013, Kosta filmed his own mini-sitcom for network TV under the auspices of FOX's Shortcom Comedy Hour with fellow comedians Neal Brennan, Dov Davidoff, Kevin Smith, and Ali Wong. In 2015, Kosta released his first comedy album on Comedy Dynamics Records, Comedy For Attractive People.

TV Hosting 
Kosta has hosted several TV shows:
 Correspondent on the Daily Show with Trevor Noah
Fox Sports Detroit show, "CCHA: All Access" won two Michigan Emmys for Outstanding Host in a TV Series (2011)
 Backstage host of the 63rd Primetime Emmy Awards “Backstage Live,” on Emmy.com’s (2011)
 Co-host of Attack of the Show! and the Next Day T.J. Miller (T.J. Miller on Hosting Comedy Central's "Mash Up")
 Featured comedian on E!’s The Soup Investigates, where he led the segment "Spoilers in the Streets"
 Catch on NBC (2014)
 Co-host of Fox Sports 1 daytime talk show 'Crowd Goes Wild
 Co-producer and host of The Comment Section on The E! Network.

Tennis 
Before comedy, Kosta played four years of collegiate tennis at the University of Illinois from 1998–2002 where he won four Big Ten Championships. After college, he went on to play professional tennis earning a career-high ATP Tour ranking of No. 864 in singles and No. 336 in doubles. Kosta has also written a book on tennis called 101 Tips for Winning More Tennis Matches.

References

External links 
 Michael Kosta official website

Living people
People from Ann Arbor, Michigan
People from Los Angeles
University of Illinois Urbana-Champaign alumni
American male comedians
Comedians from California
21st-century American comedians
1979 births
American people of Greek descent
American male tennis players
Illinois Fighting Illini men's tennis players